Buzy may refer to:

Geography
Buzy, Pyrénées-Atlantiques, France
Gare de Buzy, railway station Buzy, Pyrénées-Atlantiques, France
Buzy-Darmont, Meuse, France

Music
Buzy (singer) (1957), French singer
Buzy (band), Japanese girl band